SS Oceanic was the White Star Line's first liner and an important turning point in passenger liner design. Entering service in 1871 for Atlantic crossings, she was later chartered to Occidental and Oriental Steamship Company (O&O) in 1875. The ship provided passenger service for O&O in the Pacific until 1895 when she was sold for scrap.

Design and construction

Oceanic was built by Harland and Wolff in Belfast, and was launched on 27 August 1870, arriving in Liverpool for her maiden voyage on 26 February 1871. A single funnel exhausted smoke. Four masts carried sail; square sails on the first three masts, and fore-and-aft sails on the mizzenmast, for a four-masted barque rig. The hull was constructed of iron and divided into eleven watertight compartments. A crew of 143 operated the vessel.

The Oceanic had a capacity of approximately 1,000 third-class and 166 first-class passengers, known at the time as 'steerage' and 'saloon' class. The White Star Line was among only a handful of trans-Atlantic passenger lines to segregate their third-class accommodations; single men were berthed in the bow while berthing for single women and families was in the stern. First-class cabins were positioned amidship, away from ocean movements and the vibration of the engines.

The contemporary press described her "more an imperial yacht than a passenger liner." Innovative features included running water and electric bells to summon stewards in the first-class cabins. Portholes in the ship were much larger than on contemporary liners, providing more light. The saloon dining room was large enough to seat all first-class passengers at once. Maritime historian Daniel Allen Butler writes "With her unparalleled accommodations and stunning appearance ... the Oceanic established the White Star Line as the arbiter of comfort on the North Atlantic".

Service history

Oceanic left for her maiden voyage from Liverpool on 2 March 1871 carrying only 64 passengers, under Captain Sir Digby Murray. Not long after departing, she had to return because of overheated bearings. Her voyage restarted on 16 March. From that point onward, Oceanic was a success for the White Star Line.

She was to be the first of a series of six sister ships constructed in rapid succession: Atlantic, Baltic, Republic, Adriatic, and Celtic. All were of the same approximate dimensions with differences in tonnage, with the exception of the Adriatic and the Celtic, the designs for which were later modified to slightly increase their sizes.

In January 1872, Oceanic underwent a refit, during which a large forecastle was added to help prevent the bow being inundated during high seas. Two new boilers were added to increase steam pressure and thus engine power, and the four masts were shortened.

Oceanic continued sailing with the White Star line on the Liverpool to New York City route until 11 March 1875, when she was chartered to the Occidental & Oriental Steamship Company for service between San Francisco, Yokohama and Hong Kong. The White Star Line provided the officers, while the crew was Chinese. The ship itself remained in White Star Line colours, but flew the O&O flag. During the repositioning voyage from Liverpool to Hong Kong, Oceanic set a speed record for that route. Later, she also set a speed record for Yokohama to San Francisco in December 1876, and then broke her own record over that route in November 1889, with a time of 13 days, 14 hours and 5 minutes.

On 22 August 1888, Oceanic collided with the coastal liner  just outside the Golden Gate; the latter ship sank, killing 16 on board.

On 7 January 1890, Nellie Bly boarded Oceanic in Yokohama to cross the Pacific as part of her voyage Around the World in Seventy-Two Days. She arrived in San Francisco on 21 January 1890, which was a day behind schedule as a result of rough weather.

In 1895, Oceanic was returned to the White Star Line, which planned on putting her back into service. She was sent back to Harland and Wolff for re-engining, but when the ship was inspected closely, it was found to be uneconomical to perform all the work needed. Instead, she was sold for scrap, leaving Belfast for the last time on 10 February 1896, under tow, for a scrapyard on the River Thames.

References

External links

Oceanic info at The Great Ocean Liners
For a listing of passengers on one voyage

Ships built in Belfast
Steamships of the United Kingdom
Ships of the White Star Line
1870 ships
Ships built by Harland and Wolff
Maritime incidents in August 1888